Aloa: Festivity of the Whores is a 1988 Yugoslav film directed by Lordan Zafranović. It is based on a novel by Veljko Barbieri.

References

External links

1988 films
Croatian drama films
1980s Croatian-language films
Yugoslav drama films
Films directed by Lordan Zafranović
Jadran Film films
Films based on Croatian novels
Films set on islands